The 2011–12 Louisiana–Lafayette Ragin' Cajuns women's basketball team represented the University of Louisiana at Lafayette during the 2011–12 NCAA Division I women's basketball season. The Ragin' Cajuns were led by fifth-year head coach Errol Rogers; they played their double-header home games at the Cajundome with other games at the Earl K. Long Gymnasium, which is located on campus. They were members in the Sun Belt Conference. They finished the season 7-23, 1–15 in Sun Belt play to finish sixth place in the West Division. They were eliminated in the quarterfinals of the Sun Belt women's tournament.

Following the season, head coach Rogers resigned after going 38-113 in his five season at the helm of the program.

Previous season 
The Ragin' Cajuns finished the 2010–11 season 11–19, 4–12 in Sun Belt play to finish fifth in the West Division. They made it to the 2011 Sun Belt Conference women's basketball tournament, losing in the first round game by a score of 53-58 to the South Alabama Jaguars. They were not invited to any other postseason tournament.

Roster

Schedule and results

|-
!colspan=6 style=| Non-conference regular season

|-
!colspan=6 style=| Sun Belt regular season

|-
!colspan=6 style=| Non-conference regular season

|-
!colspan=6 style=| Sun Belt regular season

|-
!colspan=6 style=| Sun Belt Women's Tournament (0-1)

See also
 2011–12 Louisiana–Lafayette Ragin' Cajuns men's basketball team

References

Louisiana Ragin' Cajuns women's basketball seasons
Louisiana-Lafayette
Louisiana
Louisiana